Ybbsitz is a town in the district of Amstetten in Lower Austria in Austria.

Geography
Ybbsitz lies in the Mostviertel in Lower Austria.

References

Cities and towns in Amstetten District